Hotel Esplanade or Esplanade Hotel may refer to:

Australia
Esplanade Hotel, Albany, hotel that once stood overlooking Middleton Beach in Albany
Esplanade Hotel, Fremantle, hotel located opposite Esplanade Park in Fremantle
Esplanade Hotel, Melbourne,  five-level seaside pub commonly called The Espy
Esplanade Hotel, Perth, hotel on The Esplanade across from Esplanade Reserve in Perth

Other places 
Esplanade Zagreb Hotel, a historic luxury hotel in Zagreb, Croatia
Hotel Esplanade Berlin, luxury hotel in Germany destroyed in World War II

See also 
 Espy (disambiguation)
 Esplanade (disambiguation)